Xestia cervina is a species of moth of the family Noctuidae. It is found in India.

References

Moths described in 1867
Xestia
Moths of Asia